Port (Italian: Porto) is a 1934 Italian drama film directed by Amleto Palermi and starring Irma Gramatica, Camillo Pilotto and Elsa De Giorgi.

Cast
 Irma Gramatica as Maria  
 Camillo Pilotto as Mastro Vanni  
 Elsa De Giorgi as Mariuccia  
 Nerio Bernardi as Pietro Sgamba  
 Giovanni Grasso as Nicola Bellamonte 
 Piero Pastore as Salvatore - il fidanzato di Maria  
 Tonino Capitani as Il piccolo Tonino  
 Enrica Fantis as Agata  
 Ruggero Orlando 
 Massimo Ungaretti

References

Bibliography 
 Aprà, Adriano. The Fabulous Thirties: Italian cinema 1929-1944. Electa International, 1979.

External links 
 

1934 drama films
Italian drama films
1934 films
1930s Italian-language films
Films directed by Amleto Palermi
Italian black-and-white films
1930s Italian films